A sibling-in-law is the spouse of one's sibling, or the sibling of one's spouse, or the person who is married to the sibling of one's spouse.

More commonly, a sibling-in-law is referred to as a brother-in-law for a male sibling-in-law, and a sister-in-law for a female one. 

Sibling-in-law also refers to the reciprocal relationship between a person's spouse and their sibling's spouse. In Indian English this can be referred to as a co-sibling (specifically a co-sister, for the wife of one's sibling-in-law, or co-brother, for the husband of one's sibling-in-law).

Relationships
Siblings-in-law are related by a type of kinship called affinity like all in-law relationships. All of these are relations which do not relate to the person directly by blood.

Just like the children of one's siblings, the children of one's siblings-in-law are called simply nieces and nephews – if necessary, specified whether "by marriage", as opposed to "by blood" or "by adoption".

If one pair of siblings is married to another pair of siblings, the siblings-in-law are thus doubly related, each of the four both through one's spouse and through one's sibling, while the children of the two couples are double cousins.

Culture
One study, examining the issue of envy in the triadic system of sibling, sibling-in-law and spouse, concluded that "The sibling-in-law relationship shared similarities with both spousal and sibling relationships" and that "Relational closeness and satisfaction for all relationships in the triad were correlated."

In Islamic law (Sharia) and Jewish law (halakha), sexual relations between siblings-in-law are prohibited as incestuous, unless the spouse is no longer married. Conversely, in Judaism there was the custom of yibbum, whereby a man had a non-obligatory duty to wed his deceased brother's childless widow, so she might have progeny by him.

See also

Nephew and niece
Cousins-in-law
Affinity (law)

References

Affinity (law)
Kinship and descent
Law